
Gmina Drzycim is a rural gmina (administrative district) in Świecie County, Kuyavian-Pomeranian Voivodeship, in north-central Poland.

The gmina contains part of the protected area called Wda Landscape Park.

Villages
Gmina Drzycim contains the villages and settlements of Bedlenki, Biechówko, Biechowo, Dąbrówka, Dólsk, Drzycim, Gacki, Gródek, Jastrzębie, Kaliska, Krakówek, Leosia, Lubocheń, Mały Dólsk, Rówienica, Sierosław, Sierosławek, Spławie and Wery.

Neighbouring gminas
Gmina Drzycim is bordered by the gminas of Bukowiec, Jeżewo, Lniano, Osie and Świecie.

References
Polish official population figures 2006

Drzycim
Świecie County